Fort Davis Independent School District is a public school district based in the community of Fort Davis in unincorporated Jeff Davis County, Texas (USA).

Fort Davis, like other Texas communities, formerly had racially segregated schools, with the "white" school on the site of the present-day Fort Davis High School. The "Mexican school" was located at the current site of Dirks-Anderson Elementary School in Fort Davis.

In 2009, the school district was rated "academically acceptable" by the Texas Education Agency.

Schools
Fort Davis High School (Grades 6-12)
Dirks-Anderson Elementary (Grades PK-5)
High Frontier School (Serves the students enrolled in the High Frontier Treatment Center)

References

External links

Fort Davis Independent School District. Official site.

School districts in Jeff Davis County, Texas